Cenâb Şehâbeddîn (born 21 March 1870, Bitola - 12 February 1934, Istanbul), was a Turkish poet and writer. He was one of the leading representatives of Servet-i Fünûn literature.

Biography 
He was born on March 21, 1870, in Bitola. His father Osman Şahabeddin died in the 1877-1878 Russo-Turkish War (1877–1878). After the death of his father, he moved to Istanbul with his family when he was about six years old.

Education 
He attended primary school at Mekteb-i Feyziyye in Tophane. Then he entered Eyüp Military High School. After the collapse of this school, he transferred to Gülhane Military Medical Academy and graduated from here in 1880. Then he entered Medical Academy, after studying for two years, he was accepted to the fifth year of Military Medical Academy. He graduated from school as a doctor captain in 1889. As he graduated with a good degree, he was sent to Paris by the state at the beginning of 1890 to specialize in the field of skin diseases. He stayed here for about four years.

Career 
Cenap Şahabeddin is one of the main figure who has been accepted as an authority in various fields of literature, especially poetry, in his writing activities starting from 1895 and continuing until his death. He is among those who made the biggest innovations after Abdülhak Hâmid in Turkish poetry, which developed under the influence of Western literature after the Tanzimat.

Cenap Şahabeddin, who was born and raised in a family closely interested in literature, was under the influence of Muallim Naci and Şeyh Vasfi when he was fifteen or sixteen, and prepared and compiled their ghazals. His first poem was a ghazal and was published in the newspaper Saadet in 1885, while he was still a student. Later, the verse form of nineteen poems he wrote became ghazal.

After this period, the new poems of Cenap Şahabeddin, who started to read the works of masters such as Abdülhak Hâmid Tarhan and Recâizâde Mahmud Ekrem, were published in the journals Gülşen, Sebat and İmdâdü'l-midâd, together with the newspaper Saadet. While he was still a medical student, he published 18 of his poems in a small book called "Tâmât" in 1886.

Bibliography

Poem 
Tâmât (1887)
 Seçme Şiirleri (1934, ölümünden sonra)
 Bütün Şiirleri (1984, ölümünden sonra)
 "Elhan-ı Şita" 
 "Yakazat-ı Leyliye"

Theatre 
 Yalan
 Körebe (1917)
 Küçükbeyler
 Merdud Aile

Study 
 William Shakespeare (1932)
 Kadı Burhanettin

Travel article 
 Hac Yolunda (1909)
 Afak-ı Irak (1917)
 Avrupa Mektupları (1919)
 Suriye Mektupları (1917)
 "Medine'ye Varamadım (1933)

Articles 
 Evrak-ı Eyyam (1915)
 Nesr-i Harp (1918) 
 Nesr-i Sulh (1918)

References 

1870 births
1934 deaths
Writers from Istanbul
Turkish poets